Quingey is a commune and former canton seat in the Doubs department in the Bourgogne-Franche-Comté region in eastern France.

Geography

The commune is at the western extremity of the department of Doubs, a dozen km from the department of Jura. The river Loue runs through it. On the north is the valley of the river Doubs, the vast forests of Chaux and the Val d'Amour lie on the west, the mountains of Salins on the south, and the valley of the Lison on the east.

As the Loue traverses this alluvial plain, it is barred by numerous natural dams. The plain is surrounded by peaks between 470 m and 850 (the Mont Poupet).

History
Situated on the Roman road between Lyon and Strasbourg, its history goes back to the third century.

The last vestiges of its fortifications were destroyed in 1823, but the bridge over the Loue dates from 1590. It was slightly rebuilt in 1844.

Pope Calistus II was born in Quingey in c. 1065.

Population

See also
 Communes of the Doubs department

References

External links

 Quingey on the intercommunal Web site of the region 

Communes of Doubs